Douglas R. Docker (born 16 June 1967) is an American-French musician, singer, songwriter and producer known for his work with Docker's Guild, a progressive-metal space opera, and as a member of Cheap Prick, an Italian Cheap Trick tribute act. He has also worked with artists including Shining Line and Tony Mills. Docker is also the founder and owner of the Black Swan Rock School of Music, a music and ESL teaching facility located in Italy.

Biography

Classical music (1977-1999)
From 1977 to 1981, Docker performed as a second violinist in the orchestra of the Istituto Musicale Corelli of Pinerolo. From 1978 to 1988 he competed as a pianist in about a dozen international classical piano competitions (Senigallia, Stresa, Bardolino, Torre Pellice, Capri), receiving two first prizes. He also performed in recitals as a classical pianist throughout the 1980s.

In September 1989, he obtained a BA in Classical Piano at the Conservatory of Cuneo. He was then hired to play piano and organ on the album Ave Maria by Italian tenor Antonio Caffaro.

In June 1996, Docker briefly returned to classical music with a recital called "Paesaggi Esotici", performed at the Turin Museum of Natural History. Featuring Mio Nakamura on vocals, the program included operatic arias and traditional songs linked by the common theme of "the exotic" (particularly Asia).

In November 1999, he performed Allegro de Concierto by Enrique Granados at the SFI-Västertorp in Stockholm for its yearly Kulturdagen (Culture Day).

Docker's Guild (2008–present)
Docker returned to Italy in January 2008. In 2011 he published an article cataloging the Waldensian musical heritage.

In 2008, Docker began a project named "Docker's Guild". Its album The Mystic Technocracy – Season 1: The Age of Ignorance was released in 2012 on Lion Music, described by the artist's record label as a progressive rock space opera. Performers on the album included Tony Franklin, Guthrie Govan, Jeff Watson, Greg Bissonette, Goran Edman, John Payne, Tony Mills, and Amanda Somerville. Docker did not know any of the performers personally, and did not interact in person with any of them. Rather, he solicited their services on the internet. In 2016 Docker released a crowdfunded sequel entitled The Heisenberg Diaries – Book A: Sounds of Future Past. Aside from Docker, all special guests appearing on the album were women from the rock and metal world.

A Season 2 – "The Age of Entropy" – was planned but has no firm release date. Docker stated that: "Season 2 is in the works, but the format will change. The age of rock operas has passed and it's time to focus on the music rather than on the names." Despite this, he has confirmed that Anna Portalupi (Hardline) will be playing bass on the album and that drumming duties will be handled by Elisa "Helly" Montin (The Anunnaki, Cattivator Of Death, Übermensch).  In 2020, Docker released a track from Season 2 "Die Today" as a pre-production demo on the project's blog. In 2021, Docker launched an unsuccessful campaign to crowdfund the album.

In September 2019, Docker organized and headlined the Tony Mills Festival.  The festival was intended to honor his recently deceased collaborator Tony Mills, as well as raising funds for the Mills family and cancer research.  The show marked the first live appearance of Docker's Guild in four years.

In December 2019, Docker announced that The Docker's Guild would be performing a rare live performance at Entropy Fest IV in Pinerolo, Italy. However, Docker later cancelled the entire festival, for several reasons including inter alia "the chronic absence of public at the evenings despite the constant online and printed promotion".

Cheap Prick 
In the 2014, Docker formed Cheap Prick, a Cheap Trick tribute act that has performed live shows in Italy.

Vivaldi Metal Project 
In 2013, Docker was hired as an arranger and as the official lyricist for the Vivaldi Metal Project.

In 2019 it was announced that Docker had left his position.

Discography

Reliquay de Spleen
 GentiEmergenti 2 – compilation cassette (1986), keyboards on "Autolesionismo"

Anatema
 Suonomodo – compilation LP (1988), keyboards on "Love You Sometime"

Antonio Caffaro
Ave Maria (1989), classical piano and pipe organ

Douglas R. Docker 
Leykam Murztaler Soundtrack (1990), keyboards and programming, composer, arranger, engineer, and producer
PWA IP Soundtrack (1991), keyboards and programming, composer, arranger, engineer, and producer

Biloxi
 Let the Games Begin (1993), did not play on album, but was featured in all album credits and photos, and supplied keyboards on US promotional tour

Area 51
 In the Desert (1996), keyboards and programming, lead and backing vocals, composer, arranger, engineer and producer
 La Musica dal Vivo book and CD (2019), keyboards and programming, lead and backing vocals, composer, arranger, engineer and producer on "Night Time"

Rustfield
 Demo 2009 (2009), guest keyboard solos on "Compromising", "Waxhopes" and "High Waters"
 Kingdom of Rust (2013), guest keyboard solos on "Compromising", "Waxhopes" and "High Waters", piano on "Love Moan"

Docker's Guild 
 The Mystic Technocracy Demo (2009), keyboards and programming, lead and backing vocals, composer, arranger, engineer, and producer
 The Mystic Technocracy – Season 1: The Age of Ignorance (2012), keyboards, lead and backing vocals, composer, arranger, engineer and producer
 The Heisenberg Diaries - Book A: Sounds of Future Past (2016), keyboards, lead and backing vocals, arranger, engineer and producer
 This Is Rock Vol. 1 - compilation (2019), keyboards, backing vocals, composer, arranger, engineer and producer on "The Mystic Technocracy" and "Black Swans"

Shining Line
 Shining Line (2010), guest keyboards on "Strong Enough"

Last40Days 
 Lost and Found (2013), proofreading, vocal and pronunciation coaching

Tony Mills
 Over My Dead Body (2015), songwriter, arranger and lead vocals on "Bitter Suite", songwriter, arranger and keyboards on "Free Spirits", arranger and keyboards on "My Death" and "We Should Be on Right Now"

Frantic Amber
 Burning Insight (2015), guest keyboards on "Entwined" and "Soar"

Oniricide 
 Revenge of Souls (2016), proofreading, vocal and pronunciation coaching

Vivaldi Metal Project 
 The Four Seasons (2016), songwriter, arranger and lyrics on "The Illusion of Eternity", lyrics on "Vita", "Euphoria", "Sun of God", "Immortal Soul", "Thunderstorm", "The Age of Dreams", "Alchemy", "Stige", "The Meaning of Life", "The Finale Hour" and "Grande Madre"
 The Extended Sessions EP (2018), songwriter, arranger and lyrics on "The Four Seasons - Unplugged Trio Medley" [Studio Version] and  "The Four Seasons - Unplugged Duo Medley" [Live Version]; lyrics on "Vita [Original Vocal Session], "Spring #2 - Largo [Part 2] Light and Vita" [Instrumental Version] and "Spring #2 - Largo [Part 2] Light"
 The Four Seasons - Live Concert Premiers 2018 (2019), songwriter, arranger and lyrics on "The Illusion Of Eternity - Spring #1 - Allegro", lyrics on "Vita - Spring #2 - Largo [Part 2] Light", Euphoria - Spring #3 - Allegro [Part 1] Metamorphosis, "Sun Of God - Summer #1 - Allegro Non Molto", "Immortal Soul - Summer #2 - Adagio", Thunderstorm - Summer #3 - Presto, "The Age Of Dreams - Autumn #1 - Allegro", "Alchemy - Autumn #2 - Adagio Molto [Part 3] Golden Number", "Stige - Autumn #3 - Allegro", "  The Meaning Of Life - Winter #1 - Allegro Non Molto",  "The Final Hour - Winter #2 - Largo", "Grande Madre - Winter #3 - Allegro", "Tragic Serenade", "Vita (Reprise)"

References

External links

American keyboardists
Living people
Heavy metal keyboardists
American expatriates in Italy
1967 births
Musicians Institute alumni
Massacre Records artists
21st-century American keyboardists